This article lists planned or proposed high-speed rail projects, arranged by country. Although many nations have done preliminary feasibility studies, many lines are eventually shelved or postponed due to high cost, and only a few nations of those proposing are actively building high-speed rail lines. Planned or proposed lines are therefore separated here from lines that are under construction, some nations having both. High-speed rail is public transport by rail at speeds in excess of 200 km/h (125 mph).

Africa

African Integrated High Speed Railway Network 
In 2013, the African Union passed Agenda 2063, a 50-year development trajectory which includes establishing a continental free trade zone, a common passport, an end to armed conflict, an annual African economic forum, a space program, a Great African Museum, establishment of e-universities, and a continent-wide high speed rail network. Africa currently has the lowest rail density of all the inhabited continents, with 16 African countries lacking rail altogether, especially in Central Africa; most existing rail lines are single-track freight lines operating at 30 km/h which beeline from ports to industrial zones like mines and forests.

The AU signed a Memorandum of Understanding with China in 2014 for the 30-50 year development of the continental rail system connecting all continental African capitals using modern rail technology, and facilitate interoperations by using a single gauge as opposed to the current nine. The goal of a high speed rail network is to facilitate intra-African trade and lower shipping costs. The initial timeline for 2022 was to have 100% of the preparatory work complete, but currently only 12.3% of the network has been studied, largely due to funding constraints. Pre-feasibility studies which have been completed so far include the Cotonou-Niamey-Ouagadougou-Abidjan Railway at 2891 km which would cost US$5.022 billion to build and rehabilitate, and US$866 million for equipment. The Djibouti-Libreville corridor was estimated to be 2366 km and cost US$5.277 billion, and the Dakar-N'Djamena-Djibouti corridor was estimated to be 5139 km and cost US$14.05 billion. It has not yet been specified which rail lines will operate at 330 km/h, 250 km/h, and 160 km/h.

 
The Masterplan 2033 plans for 35,828 km of rail construction in Africa with the following projects. The first three are accelerated pilot projects actively under study/construction. The objectives by 2033 are to connect sixteen landlocked countries to sea ports, to provide interconnections between different regions, and provide Trans-Africa corridors. The Master Plan 2043 will expand on this network to connect all political and economic capitals by rail.

A:     Accelerated Pilot Projects

 Kigali-Dar Es Salaam (1476 km)
 Kampala-Bujumbura (596 km)
 Walvis Bay-Windhoek-Gaborone-Johannesburg (1643 km)
B:     Pilot Projects, as part of the 2033 Master Plan

 Tunis-Algiers-Casablanca (1981 km) 
 Douala-Bangui 
 Kampala-Nairobi
 Dakar-Bamako (1147 km)
 Asmara-Addis Ababa (771 km)
 Lusaka-Beira
 Alexandria-Khartoum
 Ouagadougou-Abidjan (1120 km)
 Niamey-Cotonou (955 km)

C:     2033 Master Plan
 Nairobi-Mombasa (459 km)
 Bamako-Ouagadougou-Niamey-N'Djamena-Khartoum (5384 km)
 Addis Ababa-Djibouti (637 km)
 Pointe Noire-Brazzaville-Kinshasa-Bujumbura (1755 km)
 Johannesburg-Maputo (524 km)
 Pretoria-Durban (626 km)
 Algiers-Abuja-Lagos (4111 km)
 Lobito-Lusaka (2253 km)
 N'Djamena-Bangui-Brazzaville-Luanda (2240 km)
 Addis Ababa-Nairobi-Dodoma-Lusaka-Gaborone (4812 km)
 Khartoum-Addis Ababa
 Luanda-Windhoek (1882)
 Mbeya-Lilongwe-Harare-Johannesburg-Maseru (3115 km)
 Lilongwe-Nacala (815 km)
 Lamu-Juba (1547 km)
 Bangui-Juba (1551 km)
 Juba-Kampala (672 km)
D:     2043 Master Plan
 Alexandria-Benghazi-Tripoli-Tunis (2770 km)
 Casablanca-Laayoune-Nouakchott-Dakar (2733 km)
 Dakar-Banjul-Conakry-Monrovia-Abidjan-Accra-Lagos-Douala (7595 km)
 Yaoundé-Bata-Libreville (594 km)
 Mogadishu-Addis Ababa 
 Windhoek-Cape Town (1632 km)
 Maseru-Cape Town (1135 km)
 Tripoli-N'Djamena (2437 km)

Algeria 
In 2012 the Administration of Algeria Railway (ANESRIF) began building a double-tracked 142 km electric high-speed railway reaching speeds of 220 km/h from Oued Tlélat (Oran), with stops in Sidi Bel-Abbès and Tlemcen, and is 80% complete in fall 2021, with 129 viaducts totaling 14 km and 3 tunnels totaling 1.5 km. The project was due to be finished in 2019, but faced delays due to problems with land acquisition and due to COVID-19, and is set to open by the end of 2021. In 2015, the administration started building the extension from Tlemcen to Akkid Abbas (Maghnia) on the Moroccan border, a total of 56 km designed for 220 km/h journeys, but is only 7% complete as of fall 2021, largely due to land acquisition controversies in Tlemcen and Mansourah. This section will contain the largest viaduct in Africa, the M'dig Viaduct over the Isser river, (near Aïn Fezza), which will be 130 meters high, and 1.8 kilometers long, and a 600m tunnel into downtown Tlemcen, which will boast a renovated train station. The whole 198 km project is estimated at 2 billion euros.

Egypt 

On 12 March 2018, Egypt's Transport Minister Hisham Arafat said that Egypt is in the process of launching a new high-speed railway linking the Mediterranean (Most likely referring to the northern coastal governates like Alexandria, Beheira) and the Red Sea with the participation of more than 10 international companies.

In September 2020, a Chinese-Egyptian consortium consisting of the China Civil Engineering Construction Corporation and the Egyptian Samcrete and the Arab Organization for Industrialization won a US$9 billion to build a 543-km-long high-speed railway capable of top speeds of 250 km/h. The electric-powered trains would be manufactured in Port Said with a Chinese technology transfer to Egypt.

The first 660 km was planned to begin at Mersa Matruh on the Mediterranean Sea, pass through Al-Alamein, Borg El Arab, then to Wadi El Natroun, on to the 6th October City, through southern Cairo to the New Administrative Capital, and end in Ain Sokhna on the Gulf of Suez of the Red Sea,  As of January 2021, surveying and route planning have been completed and construction is underway to build bridges and track. This initial segment is intended to be used for both passengers and freight, and is projected to cost US$3 billion with a completion date of 2023. On 14 January 2021, a Memorandum of Understanding was signed between Siemens Mobility and the National Authority of Tunnels, an authority under the Ministry of Transportation of Egypt to design, install, and maintain Egypt's first high-speed rail system. The initially-dubbed "second line" between Alexandria and Borg El Arab was combined into this contract, and both are under construction as of 2022. The Siemens-led consortium was awarded a $4.5 billion contract to build the lines from Ain Sokhna to Marsa Matruh and to Alexandria in September 2021, and is scheduled for completion in 2027. The line will be outfitted with Velaro high-speed passenger trains. This 660 km segment will be designed to carry up to 30 million passengers annually, cut travel times in half, and cut carbon emissions by 70%.

A  second line will stretch from Sixth of October City through Fayoum, Minya, Aswan, and Abu Simbel over 1,100 km on the west bank of the Nile. Local stations will include Al-Ayat, Al-Fashn, Al-Adwa, Bani Mazar, Samalout, Abu Qurqas, Mallawi, and Dayrout. Survey and construction work for this line began in March 2022 by Egyptian authorities, especially around 6 October City and Fayoum, with an anticipated design speed of 250 km/h, but preliminary operation of express trains at 230 km/h. An extension of this line was announced in May 2022 from Aswan through Abu Simbel to Toshka and Sharq El Owainat in the Western Desert, as well as an extension to Wadi Halfa, in Sudan. The Kuwait Fund for Arab Economic Development signed a $2.45 million feasibility study for a 283.5 km line from Aswan to Toshka and Abu Simbel, as well as the 80 km extension to Sudan, which includes a 6 km bridge across Lake Nasser.

The third line is planned in the south from Safaga through Sahl Hasheesh, Hurghada, East Sohag, Qena, and Qus, ending in Luxor, at a total cost of $2.7 billion with a construction time of two years. Contracts for building the second and third lines were planned to be signed by Siemens in March 2022; the 8.1 billion euro contract was signed on May 31, 2022 between the Egyptian government and Siemens (and its consortium partners Orascom Construction and The Arab Contractors), and includes the construction of the second and third line as well as 41 Velaro 8-car high-speed passenger trains, 94 Desiro high-capacity four-car regional train sets, and 41 Vectron freight locomotives, as well as ETCS Level 2 and a suitable power grid.

The entire network is projected to cost US$23 billion and span over 2000 km.

Intent to build an extension eastwards from Marsa Matruh through El Negaila to Sallum on the Libyan border, to Benghazi in Libya, was announced by Egyptian Transport Minister Kamel Al-Wazir in November 2020, and was again confirmed by the Libyan-Egyptian Chamber of Commerce on 18 January 2021. An extension to Siwa was also mentioned.  This is part of the Egyptian government's larger plan to build political and economic links with both Libya and Sudan, including to Wadi Halfa.

Libya 
Prior to the 2011 Libyan Revolution, the government under Gaddafi was actively building a high-speed rail line capable of 200 km/h operation from the Tunisian border to the Egyptian border, at a total cost of $7.9 billion. Russian Railways had won the $2.9 billion deal for the section between Sirte and Benghazi, with an anticipated completion in 2012; at least 14 km out of the planned 554 km line was laid. China Railway had been working on a $2.6 billion link between Sirte and Khums, with plans for extension westwards to Tripoli. In 2010, the Libyan government proposed a feasibility study for a $2 billion high-speed rail line between Benghazi and Tobruk, expected to be completed by 2012. Trains were to run on diesel, with eventual electrification planned. Dorsch Afrique was also involved in designing the 150 km high-speed connection between Tobruk and Umm Saad on the Egyptian border. Three kilometers of high-speed track were finished, including a station in Tripoli and one kilometer of tunnels, and thirty kilometers of right-of-way had been cleared in 2003. The rail line was subsequently plundered for its steel during the civil war.

The Libyan government has tried to resume the project several times. In 2015, Prime Minister Abdullah al-Thinni visited Moscow and set up a commission to review the project. In 2018, the Libyan government approached Russia to resume construction on the Sirte-Benghazi line, and Russian Railways responded that Tripoli would have to compensate the company for costs incurred after the project was halted in 2011. In January 2021, the Egyptian government announced plans to extend its proposed high-speed link from Alamein through El Salloum to Benghazi in Libya.

Morocco 

A trans-Maghreb high-speed rail line linking Morocco, Algeria and Tunisia is being planned. The project is expected to begin in Morocco and move towards Algiers, and finally reach Tunis. However, the difficult historical relations between Morocco and Algeria make the project not immediate. Part of this project line has opened as of November 2018 in the high-speed rail Al-Boraq, that service between Casablanca and Tangier, in Morocco and is the first of its kind on the African continent.

By 2040, Morocco additionally is planning to build a route from Kenitra to Marrakech for 40 billion MAD/~$4 billion (upgrading the current Kenitra-Casablanca segment to high-speed), and to build a route from Marrakech to Agadir for 50 billion MAD/~$5 billion. China Railway Corporation has expressed interest in the latter project to the Moroccan government in the summer of 2021. In March 2022, following completion of the design studies for the Marrakech-Agadir project, a Korea National Railway-led consortium secured a $32 billion contract with ONCF (Moroccan National Railways) for section three of the planned 230 km line.

The ONCF has announced plans to also build high-speed rail between Rabat-Fez-Oujda, on the Algerian border, by 2040. With initial feasibility studies completed, in July 2022 the ONCF announced that the first section (Rabat-Khemisset-Meknes) has begun environmental and social review, spurred by the ongoing success of the already-built sections between Tangier and Casablanca.

Namibia 
As of 2020, the Namibian government is undertaking a detailed feasibility and design study to plan a line between the port in Walvis Bay through Windhoek to Gaborone (Botswana) and Pretoria (South Africa), as part of the African Union Agenda 2063. Construction would begin in 2023 at soonest.

Sudan 
A 250 km/h rail link from the Egyptian city of Aswan to Wadi Halfa in the north of Sudan has been proposed. The $2.5 million feasibility study was signed with Kuwaiti investment in April 2022. A further standard-gauge extension from Halfa to Khartoum has been proposed to give travelers from there a one-seat ride to Alexandria.

Tunisia 
The Tunisian government and Tunisian Railways (SNCFT) are currently planning a high speed rail in three parts: a new 180 km line from Ras Jedir on the Libyan border to Gabès, to be built to 250 km/h for passenger trains and 120 km/h for freight, estimated to cost TND 2.6 billion ($917 million). The second phase will continue from Gabès through Sfax, Sousse, Nabeul, Tunis, and finish in Bizerte, a 480 km segment that will involve both new track and upgrading existing lines, for an estimated TND 14 billion ($4.9 billion). The third phase will involve an upgrade of the current line between Tunis and Tabarka on the Algerian border, a 180 km segment whose cost is estimated at TND 9.4 billion ($3.3 billion). The total cost of the 840 km electrified standard gauge line traversing the country is estimated by the Tunisian government to be TND 26 billion ($9.2 billion), as of fall 2021. No concrete action seems to have been taken beyond initiating a discussion of a partnership by the Tunisian president, Kaïs Saïed, with French president Emmanuel Macron on 22 June 2020. The following year in June 2021, President Saïed attempted to secure a loan from the European Investment Bank to finance the project, which was refused as the country had already borrowed 7 billion DT ($2.3 billion) in the prior decade; the bank suggested upgrading current rail infrastructure instead.

South Africa 
On 7 June 2010, Minister of Transport Sbusiso Ndebele said that plans were seriously being considered for a high-speed line from Johannesburg to Durban. The line would reduce the current journey time from 12 hours to about 3 hours. The 721 km line would involve major engineering challenges, including traversing the Drakensberg mountains. A high-speed line from Johannesburg to Cape Town is also under study. The $30 billion plan was seriously discussed with China Railway Group which wanted South Africa to contribute 40% of the capital, while South Africa was hoping that Chinese banks would provide a loan for the project. As of 2020, South Africa's Department of Transport announced plans to establish a high speed rail network in the country by 2025, specifically between Pretoria, Johannesburg, and Durban. The importance of this freight corridor was affirmed in Parliament in July 2021, the Chinese ambassador to South Africa confirmed in April 2022 its intent to collaborate in building a passenger/freight rail link between Johannesburg and Durban, but there remain significant questions about funding. In fall 2022, South African President Cyril Ramaphosa outlined a National Rail Act to provide financing for feasibility studies.

Americas

Argentina 
A Buenos Aires–Rosario–Córdoba high-speed railway was planned, operating at speeds of 320 km/h (200 mph). Construction was scheduled to begin in 2008 and work was expected to take around four years, but the project is currently "on hold" due to the financial crisis.

Other projected high-speed rail lines include:
 Buenos Aires-Mendoza (1200 km [750 mi]) (Planned).

Brazil 

The Rio-São Paulo High Speed rail (Abbreviation: TAV RJ-SP) is a high-speed rail proposal with the purpose of connecting Brazil's two largest metropoleis: São Paulo and Rio de Janeiro with an extension to Campinas, another metropolis conurbated with São Paulo and 100 km distant from it. The proposed route is through one of Brazil's most mountainous and urbanized terrains resulting the need of around 40% of the tracks to be built through viaducts, bridges and tunnels. Such massive need of structures has made the proposed project's price spike to US$16 billion.

Proposed:
 Brasília – Goiânia – Rio Verde – Itumbiara – Uberlândia – Uberaba – Ribeirão Preto – Campinas – São Paulo – Rio de Janeiro (1200 km).
 Belo Horizonte – São Paulo (594 km).
 Curitiba – São Paulo (410 km).
 Santos – São Paulo (80 km).
 Brasília – Goiânia (200 km).

Track gauge:  (standard gauge)

Proposed commercial speed: 350 km/h

Government mandatory stations: Rio de Janeiro Centre, Rio de Janeiro Intl Airport, Volta Redonda/Barra Mansa, São José dos Campos, São Paulo/Guarulhos Intl Airport, São Paulo Centre, São Paulo/Viracopos Intl Airport and Campinas Centre.

Cancelled due to current economic recession.

Canada 

Although Canada does not currently have high-speed rail lines, there have been two routes frequently proposed as suitable for a high-speed rail corridor:
 Edmonton to Calgary via Red Deer
 Windsor to Quebec City via London, Toronto, Ottawa, and Montreal

A possible international high-speed rail link between Montreal and Boston or New York City is often discussed by regional leaders, though little progress has been made. On another international line between Vancouver and Seattle, work is in progress to improve the existing Amtrak Cascades service, though it will not reach speeds normally associated with high-speed rail. In Ontario, the Conservative Government elected in 2018 postponed its decision on high-speed lines, but still hopes to make efforts in that direction.

Chile 
A "high-speed" 200 km/h rail connection between Santiago and Valparaíso was first proposed in 2018 by China Railway Group and again in 2019 by Spanish-based FCC and Talgo via an alternate route through Limache and Til Til. The project was initially planned to open in 2024, but was suspended in 2021 because of the Covid-19 pandemic. Either plan would cost between $2–4 billion, which Pedro Pablo Errazuriz, head of the Chilean state-owned rail firm EFE, said was too expensive to make a priority in 2022. However, in May 2022, President Gabriel Boric's administration has reiterated that the project is a priority for the government, and called for proposals by mid-year.

Colombia 
The Colombian National Agency of Infrastructure (ANI) was interested in building a High Speed rail link as part of Colombia's '4G Modernization'. The Transport Minister had said that plans and studies for the bullet train would commence in 2015. However, Colombia has the smallest train ridership of any large Latin American nation. There have been many proposals since the 1990s when Japanese firms wanted to build a bullet train network from Bogota to nearby cities, but the project was cancelled.

Mexico 

The Secretariat of Communications and Transport of Mexico originally proposed a high-speed rail link that would transport passengers from Mexico City to Guadalajara, Jalisco, with stops in the cities of Querétaro, Guanajuato, Leon and Irapuato; and a connected line running from the port city of Manzanillo to Aguascalientes. The train which would travel at 300 km/h allows passengers to travel from Mexico City to Guadalajara in just 2 hours at an affordable price (the same trip by road would last 7 hours). The network was planned to connect the network to Monterrey, Chilpancingo, Cuernavaca, Toluca, Puebla, Tijuana, Hermosillo, Cordoba, Veracruz, Oaxaca, Colima, Zacatecas, Torreon, Chihuahua, Puebla, San Luis Potosi, Mexicali Saltillo and Acapulco by 2015, but nothing had materialized by 2020. The whole project was projected to cost 240 billion pesos, or about 25 billion dollars. In 2005, Mexican billionaire Carlos Helú expressed an interest in investing in high-speed rail. Most recently the Yucatan Peninsula in Mexico has highlighted as one of the most probable areas for the development of high-speed rail in Latin America with the Transpeninsular Fast Train for bidding in September 2011.

By 2014 the route for the 1st phase of the Mexico City-Guadalajara HST had been selected. This 1st stage was to have operated from the Buenavista station in Mexico City to Querétaro with a length of 212 km of high speed line. The HST was to have been further extended into the city of Guadalajara with an immediately extension after the 1st stage to the cities of Celaya, Salamanca, Irapuato and Leon. The 1st phase was to have been completed by 2018.

The first High Speed Line in Latin America had been announced in July 2014 with the opening of an international tender to build a passenger train linking Mexico City and Querétaro at up to 300 km/h, moving 23,000 passengers a day. The line was to have been extended over 210 km, with construction beginning that year and operations starting in the second half of 2017.

On 6 November 2014, Mexico's president announced that the proposed bullet train was being postponed because there was only one bidder. Falling oil prices and the economic downturn was also believed to have played a role in the decision. In July 2018, Mexican President Andrés Manuel López Obrador revived the project, and in 2020 the Mexican government secured a 51.3 billion peso investment (US$2.3 billion) to fund the high speed rail project. As of 2022, 80 million pesos (US$3.93 million) have been allocated for initial feasibility studies, with the remaining funds planned through 2025.

In 2021, Mexican rail officials began a US$2 million feasibility study for a rail connection between San Antonio (US) and Monterrey (Mexico); unlike previous US$20 billion proposals for the line to be built for 250 mph (400 km/h) operation, this US$7 billion proposal examines a 100 mph (160 km/h) route which would take 4 hours.

Panama 
In 2019, China approached the Panamanian government with a feasibility plan for a 391 kilometer (243 mile) high speed line from Panama City to David, on the Costa Rican border. This would have been financed partially under China's Belt and Road Initiative. The project was dismissed by the Panamanian president Laurentino Cortizo in September 2019, who stated that taking on the project would be a debt overload.

United States 

There are several high-speed rail services in the United States, notably the Acela Express, but all are limited to the Northeast Corridor. Amtrak uses the Acela Express as a high-speed service between Washington, D.C. and Boston via New York City and Philadelphia along the Northeast Corridor (NEC) in the Northeast United States. The tilting design allows the train to travel at higher speeds on the sharply curved NEC without disturbing passengers, by lowering lateral forces. The Northeast Regional goes along the same route, but with more stops. All other high-speed rail services share part of the route.

There has been a resurgence of interest outside the Northeastern Corridor in recent decades, with many plans being examined for high-speed rail across the country:
 In 2002, the Texas High Speed Rail & Transportation Corporation (THSRTC), a grass roots organization dedicated to bringing high-speed rail to Texas, was established. In 2006, American Airlines and Continental Airlines formally joined THSRTC in an effort to bring high-speed rail to Texas as a passenger collector system for the airlines.
 A separate entity, Lone Star High-Speed Rail LLC, was formed in 2009 to plan a railway between Dallas and Houston. The company changed its name to Texas Central Railway in 2013, and has been developing the system based on technology used on Japanese Shinkansen lines. The  route traverses open farms and ranches with one intermediate stop in the Brazos Valley. Regulatory approvals cleared in September 2020; the service is expected to begin in 2026.
 The California High-Speed Rail Authority was created in 1996 by the state to implement an extensive  rail system that is estimated to cost about $40 billion. Once built, the system will not require operating subsidies, and it is expected to generate $1 billion in annual profits. Construction has been approved with the passing of proposition 1A, in which a $9.95 billion general obligation bond was authorized by voters. The system would provide high-speed service between and among major cities, like Sacramento, San Francisco, Los Angeles, and San Diego, and would allow travel between Los Angeles' Union Station and San Francisco's Transbay Terminal in two and a half hours. On 2 December 2010, the California High-Speed Rail Authority announced the first section of the Californian High-Speed Rail network had been selected and construction was to start in 2012, but delays postponed it to 2015. The line will run from near Madera south to Bakersfield, with stations at Fresno and Hanford, at a length of  running through a rural part of the San Joaquin Valley. The line will connect with traditional Amtrak lines at each end. In December 2010, that funding was doubled after the newly elected governors of Ohio and Wisconsin decided to cancel right of way projects which had been allocated $1.2 billion of funding by the federal government. Of that amount, $616 million was then granted to California in addition to funding already promised, which, when combined with a state bond issue to match the new funding, provided over $1.2 billion in addition funding. This will be used to add an additional  of track, bringing the line to the edge of Bakersfield.
Started as an independent venture in 2005, the project changed hands several times before being acquired by Brightline, who had recently begun their initial Florida route. Construction is expected to start in 2020 with service to commence in 2024.
 In September 2010, Amtrak unveiled proposals for  trains to run between Washington, D.C. and Boston, stopping at various cities along the way, including Baltimore, Philadelphia, and New York. The end-to-end journey time would be three hours. The proposals would cost $117 billion and would take 25 years to complete. Amtrak estimates that the capacity would be needed, as, even after current investment programs, the Acela trains will be full by 2030. The proposal envisages completion by 2040.
 North American High Speed Rail Group is seeking to build a privately financed high speed rail line between Rochester and Minneapolis-St. Paul. The line is expected to cost $4.2 billion to build. The eventual goal is to extend high-speed rail service to Chicago.

Asia

Bangladesh 

Bangladesh considered building a high speed rail link between Dhaka and Chittagong in 2005. The government short-listed France's SNCF and Japan Railways for the project. But the plan was then shelved. Spain and China had later, in 2014, expressed interests in developing the Bangladesh Railway into a high-speed network. In summer of 2021, the Chinese ambassador in Dhaka, Li Jiming, stated that China was interested in investing in the construction of the line. In March 2022, Russian-based RZD International approached Bangladesh Railway about financing the project, for which feasibility and design studies have already been completed; the 225 km route would cost an estimated $11.1 billion. In June 2022, the Chinese ambassador to Bangladesh, Li Jiming, expressed interest in the project and wrote to Railways Minister Nurul Islam Sujan for accelerated negotiation of signing a memorandum of understanding between China Railway Group and Bangladesh Railways under a government-to-government Public Private Partnership.

The economic feasibility has a good outlook: 90% of the country's trade runs through Chattogram port, and 80% of exports run on the current Dhaka-Chattogram highway, giving strong incentive to create a usable freight rail line. A 300 km/h direct passenger journey would hover at 55 minutes, increased to 75 minutes with intermediate stops in Narayanganj, Cumilla, and Feni; the current travel time is six hours.

Cambodia 
In December 2021, Prime Minister Hun Sen confirmed that the government of Cambodia is interested in high-speed-rail, with a feasibility study for upgrading the current standard line from Phnom Penh to Sihanoukville (266 km), and from Phnom Penh to Poipet (386 km).  He also stated intent to build new rail lines by continuing from Poipet through Siem Reap to Kampong Thom, and building a line from Phnom penh to Bavet on the Vietnamese border. The current railways can only run between 20–30 km/h, largely due to damage from the civil war in the 1970s, and the line to Sihanoukville was rehabilitated in 2016, while the line to Poipet was only rehabilitated in 2018, which reconnected to the Thai rail network across the border in 2019. The country's prime minister has assigned the Minister of Public Works and Transport with the task of finding an international development partner.

India 

Four more corridors are currently under consideration to be proposed under the National Rail Plan 2022, which will increase the number to 12 corridors, bringing the total length to 8,110 km (5,039 mi). Formation of National High Speed Rail Authority (NHSRA), a body that will look after the implementation on High Speed Rail in India had been announced in Rail budget of 2012–2013, although no firm date has been set for construction initiation or completion. Central Japan Railway Company has promoted the Shinkansen for India, while France has also shown interest in collaboration for long-term development of the Pune-Mumbai-Ahmedabad route. Spain's Talgo has also expressed interest in the projects, and plans to open an office in India to promote its technology. 

On 12 December 2015, India and Japan signed a deal for a US$15 billion deal to build a high-speed line between Mumbai and Ahmedabad. Japan will provide a very low interest loan of US$12 billion. This deal was part of a greater Memorandum of Understanding (MoU) involving transfer of defense technology and civil nuclear cooperation among others. Pre-construction preparatory work began in the third quarter of 2017, and was expected to be completed in December 2023. However, due to slow land acquisition in Maharashtra and due to the ongoing COVID-19 pandemic, which caused lack of labor and resulted in delays in work, the expected date of completion for the corridor's portion from Surat to Bilimora in Gujarat is now delayed to 2026, while the entire corridor will be completed by October 2028.

The Government of Kerala has proposed in constructing a high-speed rail corridor by the name of Silverline to carry both freight and passengers along the length of the state, from Kasargod in the north end to Kerala's capital, Thiruvananthapuram in the south end. The project is estimated to be completed by 2025 and is expected to cost . The Kerala government and the Union Ministry of Railways (jointly: Kerala Rail Development Corporation) plan intermediate stations in Kannur, Kozhikode, Tirur, Thrissur, Cochin Airport, Ernakulam, Kottayam, Chengannur, and Kollam; of the 1383 hectares needed for the project, 1198 are private land, and the project would displace 30,000 families. Other criticisms of the project include the plan for standard gauge in a system that uses Indian gauge, low ridership estimates, hydrological problems, and stations distant from the city centers. The project missed the mid-July 2022 deadline for completing the social impact assessments for the line, having only consulted 45 out of 190 villages involved, leaving the project in legal limbo in front of the Kerala High Court. The Minister of Railways of India expressed his doubts about the feasibility of the Silver Line project on 29 July 2022.

A third high speed rail project between Delhi and Varanasi is under construction and will cover an 813 km distance in less than 4 hours, at a speed of 330 km/h (compared to the 10 hour journey today). The project is planned to have service at 22 minute intervals with thirteen stations, including Delhi (Kale Khan), Noida, Jewar Airport, Mathura, Agra, Etawah, South Kannauj, Lucknow, Ayodhya, Rae Bareli, Prayagraj,Bhadoi, Banaras, and Varanasi, with a railway bridge over the Ganges River.

As of summer 2022, the Karnataka government has begun acquiring land for the right of way, and is awaiting a Memorandum of Understanding with neighboring state Tamil Nadu to facilitate land acquisition for the project.

Indonesia 
Since 2006, Indonesian authorities have expressed an interest in high-speed rail for the densely populated island of Java, probably linking the cities of Jakarta, Bandung, and Surabaya. Since 2008, government with Japan International Cooperation Agency (JICA) and Japan Transportation Consultant has done pre-feasibility study. The Jakarta-Surabaya High-Speed Rail is 685 km (425 mi) long. It will connect both the cities in 35 minutes (compared with current 2 hours 53 minutes) with a maximum speed of 350 km/h and average speed 300 km/h. The construction project will need 14.3 billion, exclude land acquisitions and detail engineering design, so the total cost predicted was $20 billion.

In July 2015, Indonesian Government revealed their plan to build high-speed rail in Indonesia. Japan and China competed to win the project, previously both nations have done comprehensive studies on the project. On late September 2015, Indonesia awards this multibillion-dollar railway project to China. On 16 October 2015, Indonesia and China signed an agreement to build Jakarta-Bandung High-Speed Rail as first phase of the project. Groundbreaking has been done on 21 January 2016. The project has 60% of Indonesian consortium and 40% of China Railway International. The project is 90% completed as of fall 2022, and is expected to begin its operations in the end of 2022.

Completion of the next phases of the project to Cirebon, Semarang, and Surabaya is uncertain given that the capital's relocation and completion of the Trans-Java highway might affect demand. However, the Indonesian Transportation Ministry has outlined the construction of high-speed rail to Semarang as a priority as of spring 2022.

Iran 

Iran has a high-speed rail under construction connecting three major cities of Tehran, Qom and Isfahan. The line will have a station in Imam Khomeini International Airport. The route length will be 422 km (262 mi) with the operating speed of 350 km/h, decreasing the travel time from 5 hours to 90 minutes. The project costs over 7 billion Euros and will be open in 2022, built by China Railway Engineering Corporation.

A 117 km (73 mi) double track branch from Qom to Arak will be built for 300 km/h headway at 1.2 billion euros (including Arak station and 6 viaducts), a contract which the Islamic Republic of Iran Railways initially awarded to Italian-based Ferrovie dello stato in 2017, but was reawarded to Chinese corporations following enforcement of US-led sanctions in 2018, alongside many other rail projects.

Another high-speed rail was planned to link Tehran the capital to Mashhad, the second largest city in Iran. In 2016, the route was planned to have 800 km rail and the speed of 400 km/h which would have decreased the travel time from 8 hours to 3.5 hours. A reduced $1.5 billion plan for electrification and upgrading of the existing 967 km line from 160 km/h to 200 km/h was signed by a consortium of Iranian (Mapna Group) and Chinese companies in July 2017, before the Chinese backed out in January 2021.

Israel 
In 2020, Israel's National Infrastructure Committee approved high-speed rail links between the four metropolitan cities – Jerusalem, Tel Aviv, Haifa and Beersheba. The project is slated for completion by 2040, with a top speed of 250 km/h. The high-speed electrified connection between Tel Aviv and Haifa will cost $3.8 billion and reduce travel time from 1 hour to 30 minutes, due to be completed by 2030 but with no budget for rolling stock. Further plans currently planned for completion by 2040 include an extension north of Haifa, a continuation from Tel Aviv through Ben Gurion Airport to Jerusalem, and an unspecified connection to Beersheva.

Japan 

A maglev line between Tokyo and Osaka, the Chuo Shinkansen, is under construction by the Central Japan Railway Company (JR Central).
The Nagoya-Tokyo section is planned to be opened in 2027. The Nagoya-Osaka section is projected to be completed in 2045.

The route is to be privately financed through bond sales by JR Central, but the intermediate stations will be financed by local governments.
JR Central expects at least 8 years between the completion of the Tokyo section and the start of construction of the Osaka to rebuild its financial position.
The federal government is exploring options to accelerate the project.

Research on high-speed rail systems based on magnetic levitation have been ongoing since the 1970s, led by JR Central.
The trains and guideways are technologically ready and over 100,000 people have ridden them.
The Yamanashi test track is to be incorporated into the under construction Tokyo–Osaka maglev route.

Extensions to the current network expansions, notably from Hakodate to Sapporo, have been approved for construction. The route of the final extension of the Hokuriku Shinkansen has not been finalised. It is ultimately to provide a northern route through to Osaka.

Conventional routes planned in 1973 are on hold (to be built after current lines opening). Further Hokkaido Shinkansen extension was proposed in 1970s, even to Russian border via possible tunnel, tunnel to South Korea is also proposed.

Kazakhstan 

Qazaqstan Temir Zholy, the national rail company of Kazakhstan, has awarded a contract to oversee the design and construction of a high-speed line from Nur-Sultan (the country's capital) to Almaty (its largest city). A  viaduct across Lake Balkhash is planned near Sayaq. The system will use Russian gauge, the same as used by Kazakhstan's existing conventional lines.

In 2021, the Kazak Prime Minister Asqar Mamin announced plans to extend the high-speed rail line terminating in Tashkent, Uzbekistan, across the border to Shymkent and Turkistan.

North Korea 
North Korea does not have a high-speed railway. Attempts were made in the 1970s to speed-up its network, when one electric trainset (using the bullet-train design) was built. However, the trainset never had regular services, due to the troubling economic crisis following the dissolution of the Soviet Union. In the 2000s, the Chinese government proposed a high-speed railway for the DPRK, but these proposals are still too far from planning or construction stage. Changes in foreign policy in during 2017 and 2018 encouraged both Koreas to start international railway projects. The Chairman of the State Affairs Commission has shown interest in high-speed rail technology

Malaysia 

A high-speed rail running at 300 km/h (186 mph) to link Kuala Lumpur and Singapore was proposed in 2006 by YTL Corporation, operator of the KLIA Express in Malaysia, although the company did propose a similar system back in the late 1990s. Plans for the project were put on hold in April 2008 due to high cost to the government, estimated at RM8 billion. The project also faces opposition from rail operator rivals such as Keretapi Tanah Melayu, and the liberalisation of the Kuala Lumpur-Singapore air route further dampened prospects for the proposal.

In 2007, Siemens expressed interest in becoming the technology provider for the proposed rail link. By the middle of 2009, YTL again revived talk on the project and expressed hope that the Malaysian government would relook at the proposal, claiming that delays in the project has caused development costs to rise over the years.

In 2010, Malaysia had made a proposal to revive the project. In the new proposal, the route will be in two phases; the first one is from Kuala Lumpur to Singapore while the second phase will be from Kuala Lumpur to Penang.

On 19 February 2013, Singapore and Malaysia announced that they officially agreed to build a high-speed rail link between Kuala Lumpur and Singapore by 2020. The KL – Singapore section was planned to be about 380 km long with an expected travel time of 90 minutes. The high-speed railway terminus for Singapore was to be located in Jurong East at the Jurong Country Club site while the terminus for Malaysia was to be located at Bandar Malaysia in Sungai Besi.

After the landslide defeat of Najib Razak in May 2018, his successor, Mahathir Mohamad told the Financial Times that the project would be delayed in favor of cheaper alternatives, like spending RM 20 billion to upgrade the Keretapi Tanah Melayu (KTM) line so that trains can run at 200 km/h and align the KTM line to Jurong East Station. On 5 September 2018, an agreement to defer the project until 31 May 2020 was signed between Singapore and Malaysia with completion pushed back to 1 January 2031 instead of 31 December 2026, following initial plans to scrap it. In addition, Malaysia remitted S$15 million in abortive costs to Singapore on 31 January 2019.

Subsequently, on 31 May 2020, Singapore agreed to Malaysia's request to delay the project for the final time to discuss and clarify proposed changes, ending on 31 December 2020. As no agreement could be reached by that day, on 1 January 2021, the HSR project was terminated. As a result, Malaysia needed to pay compensation to Singapore of about S$102.8 million, which was transferred on 29 March 2021. In March 2022, talks were scheduled again between the Malay and Singaporean governments to revive the high-speed rail project under new terms.

On 26 February 2022, Thailand and Malaysia agreed to carry out a feasibility study between Kuala Lumpur and Bangkok. On 17 May 2022, the two countries set up a joint committee to coordinate the planning of the Bangkok-Kuala Lumpur HSR project.

Myanmar 
Plans have been published to build a high-speed railway between Yangon and Kunming in China, a distance of 1920 km. Construction is said to start after agreements with China was signed in 2011.[11] The project was put on hold in 2014 due to financial feasibility and national security concerns. The project was rebooted in 2019.

Oman 
Oman, which currently has no rail network, has planned a 2,144 km national high-speed rail network, mainly connecting the seaports of Salalah, Duqm, and Sohar, and linking to the Gulf Railway at Hafeet on its border with the United Arab Emirates. The project was put on hold in 2014 due to oil prices collapsing, and the link to the Gulf Railway was paused in 2016 as other countries paused the project. The planned network will be double-tracked, non-electrified, and have 220 km/h passenger traffic but plan to increase to 350 km/h, and international connections to Yemen through Mazyounah and to the Emirates through Al-Buraimi.

Pakistan 
In 2021, Haier Pakistan suggested a 1,872 km passenger between Peshawar and Karachi along the current motorway which could run at 350 km/h and reduce the travel time to 5 hours and 30 minutes. However the validity of the news is still a question.

Persian Gulf Countries 

The countries of the Gulf Cooperation Council (UAE, Oman, Qatar, Bahrain, Kuwait and Saudi Arabia) plan a 2200-kilometre rail network, Etihad Railway, which may include high-speed rail from Dubai to Abu Dhabi. However it presently runs only a freight line in between.

In 2010, the government of Qatar has announced it intends to have high-speed rail links to Bahrain and Saudi Arabia built in time for its hosting of the 2022 FIFA World Cup. This project was sidetracked by the Qatar crisis, but in early 2022, the Qatari and Saudi ministers of transport resumed talks about the proposed highspeed rail link.

In 2022, the Saudi Crown Prince proposed a megaproject in Tabuk (The Line) which would feature a 500 km/h rail line.

Philippines 

The San Miguel Corporation proposed building a bullet train system connecting Laoag City in the northern part of Luzon island, with Manila and the Bicol Region in Southeastern Luzon. As of 2010, this project has been put on hold.

In April 2013, the National Economic and Development Authority (NEDA) announced plans by the Metro Pacific Investments Corporation (MPIC) to fund the Clark-Metro Manila high-speed train project under a Build-Operate-Transfer scheme. The project will be called "Express Airport Trains" and will have at least three stops in Metro Manila. It will be built between the lanes of the North Luzon Expressway (NLEx). The trains are planned to have stops in Quezon City, Manila, and Makati. It would rather qualify as higher-speed rail similar to trains on the Tel Aviv–Jerusalem railway which was also marketed during its proposal stage as a high-speed line. Similarly, the South Main Line reconstruction project, dubbed "South Long Haul", will have express trains that have the same maximum speed.

Current railway projects such as the PNR South Long Haul are being designed for eventual upgrading to high-speed rail, and there are plans for HSR.

Singapore 
See Malaysia.

Thailand 

The State Railway of Thailand and the Thai Ministry of Transport have plans for several high-speed rail lines. A HSR line to the eastern seaboard was first proposed in 1996 but there was no progress for over a decade. In 2009, the government requested the Office of Transport and Traffic Policy and Planning (OTP) to create a plan for new HSR network in Thailand that included an eastern HSR line to Rayong. In October 2009, it was reported that funding was being sought for four lines, linking Bangkok to Chiang Mai (711 km), Nong Khai (600 km), Chanthaburi (330 km), and Padang Besar (983 km). In November, it was reported that the Thai cabinet had approved the plan, with the shorter Eastern HSR route to Chanthaburi being intended for construction first. The total cost of all routes are 800 billion baht or US$25 billion. In October 2010, the Thai parliament approved initial proposals for a high-speed rail network to be built with Chinese industrial partners; 5 lines capable of 250 km/h would radiate from Bangkok, with the line to Ubon Ratchathani later dropped. The routes were finalized before the 2011 election with the promise to begin construction the next year if the government was re-elected, but they lost the election.

After the 2011 election of opposition leader Yingluck Shinawatra, the new government reviewed all HSR plans, cutting them into phases with priority between Bangkok and Pattaya, Hua Hin, and Nakhon Ratchasima, expecting to tender the lines in 2014.

After the May 2014 coup there were further delays while the military government reviewed all HSR lines, initially deferring all projects. Transport Minister Prajin Juntong and his Japanese counterpart Akihiro Ota signed a deal on 27 May 2015 to conduct a feasibility study for the full Northern HSR. In early 2016, the military government (NCPO) agreed to proceed with the eastern HSR route and suggested that it could be extended to Don Mueang International Airport beyond the terminus at Bang Sue Intercity Terminal thus providing a direct link between the three major airports of Bangkok, including Suvarnabhumi Airport, and U-Tapao International Airport. In 2017, the Office of Traffic Policy and Planning, alongside the Ministry of Transport and the State Railway of Thailand, agreed to this revised plan. In October 2017, the Eastern Economic Corridor Office (EEC Office) finalized previous plans to build the 10 station Eastern HSR line linking Don Mueang airport, Bang Sue, Makkasan, Suvarnabhumi Airport, Chonburi, Si Racha, Pattaya, U-Tapao Airport, and Rayong. In early 2018, the section to Rayong was excluded due to environmental and safety concerns and it was decided that the line would terminate at U-Tapao Airport. In October 2019, after months of delay, the Thai government signed an agreement with  a Charoen Pokphand-China Railway Construction consortium worth $7.4 billion to build the Eastern HSR from Bangkok to Pattaya in a public-private partnership, with assets reverting to state ownership after 50 years.

The Japan International Cooperation Agency conducted a feasibility study for the Northern HSR to Chiang Mai, and in 2018 reported that the passenger projections were too low for economic viability. The 670 kilometer line was estimated to cost 400 billion baht, and both private investors and the Japanese government turned away from the project. However, the Ministry of Transport denies that Japan cancelled the project. On 14 December 2022, the Department of Railways and MLIT-JICA discussed speeding up feasibility studies for the Bangkok-Chiang Mai HSR, to be finished by March 2023, and requested a study on the economic impact of the station area development.

The Southern HSR to Hua Hin would be 211 km, and estimated at 152 billion baht, and a full extension to the Malaysian border was discussed in September 2021. In 2022, Malaysia and Thailand agreed to set up a joint committee to coordinate a Bangkok-Kuala Lumpur high speed rail project, with a feasibility study begun in February.

As of summer 2022, Thailand has fully committed to building the $12 billion Northeastern HSR to the Laotian border by 2028 at a 250 km/h double-tracked standard-gauge.

Turkey 
The Turkish government has significantly invested in high speed rail, with some lines like the Ankara-Istanbul high-speed railway having opened in 2014, the Ankara-Konya high-speed railway having opened in 2011, with the extension to Karaman opened in winter 2022. Continuation of the line from Karaman to Ulukışla is currently under construction in 2022, and further plans to link Aksaray, Ulukışla, and Mersin have an anticipated opening in 2024, but are not yet tendered. The Turkish government aims to connect 52 provinces with high-speed train networks by 2053, and will elaborate on further lines as current construction comes to completion.

Lines currently under construction include the Ankara-Sivas high-speed line, which was originally planned to open in late 2021, but will likely open sometime in 2022 due to construction deficiencies, and will reduce travel times to under 2 hours. A further 247 km extension from Sivas to Kars is concretely planned as an electrified and double-tracked line with a design speed of 250 km/h, and the five-station design study between Sivas and Erzincan was completed in July 2021.

A spur from Yerköy to Kayseri has not yet been tendered, but is planned to be completed by 2025, reducing travel times between Ankara and Kayseri from seven hours to two hours. The 142 km spur to Kayseri would be double-tracked electrified rail designed for 250 km/h operation with 9 tunnels totaling 12.9 km. Construction on the spur officially began in July 2022, and will include intermediate stations at Şefaatli, Yenifakılı, and Himmetdede.

The Ankara-Izmir high-speed railway is a planned 588 km double-tracked electrified railway built for 250 km/h operation, whose initial section to Afyonkarahisar is scheduled to open in 2022. The extension to Izmir will contain 49 tunnels totaling 41 km, 56 viaducts totaling 23 km, and six new stations, reducing the current 9-hour road trip to a 3.5 hour travel time.

A 106 km spur off the Istanbul-Ankara line from Osmaneli to Bursa is planned to open by 2023, after construction delays due to earthquake risk and expropriation lawsuits; further extension to Bandirma was tendered in  2020, and the full 201 km line will be built for 200 km/h operation and will cost 9.5 billion lira ($650million USD), bringing travel times between Ankara and Bursa to 2 hours and ten minutes.

A 229 km high speed rail line on the European side of the Bosporus will link Halkalı Train Station in Istanbul with Kapıkule Station in Edirne, with an anticipated opening of 2023, and will decrease travel time from 4 hours to 1 hour 20 minutes. The double-tracked electrified railway will be built for 200 km/h operation and cost 10.5 billion lira ($716 million USD), of which more than half is provided by a European Union grant.

Turkmenistan 
President Gurbanguli Berdimuhamedov announced that Turkmenistan would build a high-speed train between Turkmenbashi and Turkmenabat in 2012.

Uzbekistan 
In addition to the current high speed network of Uzbekistan from Tashkent through Samarkand to Bukhara, in December 2021 the Asian Development Bank approved a $162 million loan for electrification between Bukhara and Khiva, constituting 60% of the anticipated cost. The 452 km line already has a design speed of 250 km/h and is only missing electrification for high-speed rail service; in July 2022 a contract was awarded to DB E&C for electrification with construction set to begin in fall 2022, with intermediate stops at Navbokhar, Parvoz, Kiyikli, Zhaikhun, Turon, Khazarasp, and Urgench.

Vietnam 

The funding of the $56 billion line would mostly come from the Vietnamese government, with Japanese aid. Technology used on the Japanese Shinkansen has been suggested to be used for this new railway.

Current technology allows trains travelling on the current, single-track Hanoi to Ho Chi Minh City line to complete the journey in approximately thirty hours. Once completed, the high-speed rail line would have 2 parallel standard gauge tracks with no direct road crossings, and would allow trains to complete the Hanoi–Ho Chi Minh City journey in approximately 6 hours. The existing line uses narrow gauge tracks common in Southeast Asia.

Vietnamese prime minister Nguyễn Tấn Dũng had originally set an ambitious target to complete the line by 2013, three years sooner than the previously announced nine-year construction time. Later reports suggested Japanese development aid would only be available in stages, with completion of the line not expected until the mid-2030s; the same reports asserted that aid would be conditioned upon the export of Shinkansen technology. On 19 June 2010, after a month of deliberation, Vietnam's National Assembly rejected the high-speed rail proposal due to its high cost, leaving the project's future in doubt; National Assembly deputies are said to have asked for further study of the project.

In January 2011, Vietnamese Minister of Transport, Hồ Nghĩa Dũng, suggested the line might be completed by 2030. The length of the proposed line was listed as 1555 km long with trains running at 300 km/h. After the rejection of the original plan by the house of deputies, Minister Dung has asked for a new feasibility plan by the end of 2011, whilst the Japanese development agency has suggested an interim solution where the line could be built to separate north and south sections. In 2021, the Vientamese Ministry of Transport announced plans to begin in 2028 with the a 250 km segment from Hanoi to Vinh and a 450 km segment between Ho Chi Minh City and Nha Trang, with a total cost of $5bn and a design speed of 320 km/h. In July 2022, Prime Minister Pham Minh Chinh requested support from the Japan Bank for International Cooperation for $10 billion in aid towards the project.

Europe

Belarus 
In 2017,  Belarusian authorities agreed to offer land territories to CRCC Asia for construction of high-speed corridor between European Union (EU) and Russia. Chinese Engineering Companies are also interested in building highways and Russian High-Speed Railways, running in connection with this route with possible interchange with Moscow–Kazan High-Speed Rail Corridor. In 2019, Belarus also participated in the discussion of the planned St.Petersburg–Hamburg High-Speed Rail Corridor, but it is not yet added to official proposals.

Belgium 
The 25N line opened in 2012–2018 is designed for speeds up to 220 km/h, but is limited to 160 km/h. In order to reduce traffic and time consumption, an existing line from Mechelen to Antwerp has been upgraded. Construction began in June 2013 and was completed in November 2021. It was opened to traffic on 14 December 2021.

Czechia 
In 2017, the Government of the Czech Republic approved a high-speed rail development program, predicted to cost 645 billion korunas, or over 25 billion euros. The entire network will cover about 660 kilometers, and will include both the construction of new lines as well as upgrading existing lines to 200 km/h.

 RS1 – Prague–Brno–Ostrava, with possible extension to Katowice in Poland.
 RS2 – Brno–Breclav, with possible extensions to Vienna in Austria and Bratislava in Slovakia.
 RS3 – Prague–Plzen, with possible extension to Munich in Germany.
 RS4 – Prague–Ústí nad Labem, with possible extension to Dresden in Germany.
 RS5 – Prague–Liberec or Hradec Králové, with possible extension to Wrocław in Poland.

In 2018, Správa železnic, the Czech Railway Infrastructure Manager, began working on three pilot projects for increasing speed on pre-existing lines. These include the sections between Prague and Poříčany (30 km), Brno and Vranovice (25 km), and Přerov and Ostrava (60 km).

In 2020, German Deutsche Bahn (DB) and Government of Czech Republic agreed to undertake construction of the new high speed rail link between Prague and Dresden (RS4), and started feasibility studies. The project is estimated to cost a total of 5.4 billion euros, and will include a 25 km tunnel beneath the Ore Mountains. The travel time on the current route is 2 hours and 15 minutes, but the new link is predicted to reduce travel times between Prague and Dresden to just 60 minutes. The first section, between Prague and Lovosice, is predicted to be completed before 2035, with the rest completed by 2050.

Denmark 
 A high-speed rail is being planned as a double track between the Copenhagen–Ringsted Line, which opened in 2019. It initially allows 200 km/h with the rail infrastructure prepared for 250 km/h when signalling is upgraded.
There are plans to upgrade the existing railway Ringsted–Odense to 200 km/h or more. 
The existing Ringsted–Rødbyhavn is being upgraded to 200 km/h, in preparation for the completion of the Fehmarn tunnel, allowing fast connection between Copenhagen and Hamburg.
In 2021 construction began on the new Vestfyn Line, a new 250 km/h line connection Odense on the island of Funen to the existing bridge to Jutland, but with considerations for alignment to a future bridge allowing high speed crossing of the belt.
 There are plans to build a new railway for 250 km/h Odense–Aarhus.
These projects are planned to reduce the travel time Copenhagen–Aalborg to three hours compared to 4:20 as of 2018, and to one hour between each of Copenhagen, Odense, Aarhus and Aalborg.
This one has no decided year for realisation.
 A proposal led by lobbyists is also the  Kattegat Bridge with connecting high speed railway, able to connect Copenhagen with Aarhus in less than two hours, and complementing the congested and vulnerable Great Belt Bridge.

Finland 
 Helsinki–Turku high-speed railway: a proposed rail link between Helsinki and Turku with planned maximum speed of 
 Plans exist for a high-speed connection between Helsinki and Tampere with a travel time of one hour through the planned Lentorata tunnel from Helsinki to Kerava via Helsinki Airport station, and either upgrade the Riihimäki–Tampere railway to high speed standard or build a new parallel line.
 An eastern high-speed line between Helsinki and Kouvola via the airport and Porvoo is also planned, known as Itärata.

Hungary 
On 28 January 2020, a call for tenders was issued for a detailed feasibility study of the proposed line between Budapest and Cluj-Napoca in Romania. The section within Hungary is expected to accommodate speeds of 250–350 km/h while the Romanian section will have a line speed of 160 km/h.

Iceland 

• An airport rail link is under planning, The train will be called the 'Lava Express', travelling as it does past the famous lava fields of South-West Iceland. The line will be 49 km long, of which 14 km will be underground, towards the Reykjavik end. The average speed of the train will be 180 km/h, with a maximum speed of 250 km/h. However, the Airport Rail Link's construction has been postponed due to the ongoing COVID-19 pandemic. The date of the start of the construction is currently unconfirmed, and will be decided later.

Ireland 
In 2020 the Irish Government confirmed it will be launching a study into an approximately 500 km high-speed railway from Belfast via Dublin to Cork and Limerick, which could cost around €15 billion.

Netherlands 
The proposed HSL-Oost line was cancelled in 2009. The section of that proposed line between Amsterdam and Utrecht is four-tracked. 2 tracks out of 4 are capable for 200 km/h, but electrification voltage is not enough, the line is planned to be re-electrified to 25 kV AC. Another problem on that section as in more parts in the Netherlands is that the ground isn’t stable enough for higher speed due to peat.

Norway 
 The Norwegian government has examined five long-distance high-speed lines radiating out from Oslo to Bergen, Kristiansand/Stavanger, Trondheim, Gothenburg, and Stockholm. A sixth line would be a coastal line between Bergen, Haugesund and Stavanger. At least two investigations on cost and benefit have been made, released 2007 and 2012. These plans were shelved in 2013, although still open for restart in a decade or so.
 There are ongoing and coming projects for high-speed upgrades on the closest 50–100 km from Oslo on each of these lines (except direction Stockholm). They have good potential for regional trains. Upgrade and new construction to high-speed standard have to some extent already taken place like for Gardermobanen. The time plan is to have 200 km/h or more from Oslo to Porsgrunn (partially slower), to Hamar and to Råde east of Moss around 2020–2025, and to Halden and Hønefoss later, maybe 2030.
The regional projects near Oslo have higher priority than the long-distance projects. They are also preconditions for the long-distance projects, since they will be used by long-distance trains.

Poland 

 Warsaw to Poznań and Wrocław via Łódź (planning postponed in 2011)
 Warszawa-Toruń-Gdańsk high-speed railway
 Central Rail Line was designed for speeds of up to 250 km/h. 200 km/h is used in commercial service, however higher speeds are planned later.

Portugal 
Portugal's Prime Minister António Costa announced in September 2022 a $4.7 billion passenger rail line running round 300km (185 miles) from Lisbon-Oriente to Porto-Campanhã, cutting travel time by over 50% to 75 minutes non-stop, and 105 minutes with stops in Leiria, Coimbra and Aveiro. A future second phase will include another 150km (100 miles) to Porto Airport, Braga, Valença, and a connection to Vigo in Spain.
 Lisbon–Porto high-speed rail line (proposed in 2020)

Romania 
In 2021, the European Commission approved 3.9 billion euros for rail in Romania's National Recovery and Resilience Plan, which will modernize railways, rolling stock, and signaling systems. A 120 million euro feasibility study for a high-speed line between Constanta through Bucharest to the Hungarian border was begun in 2022 and expected to be completed by 2026. Among the possible options are a fully high-speed 590 km route be through Sibiu, Cluj, and Oradea which could cost 17 billion euros; another possibility is a hybrid line with some sections at 200 km/h, and some sections at 160 km/h.

Russia 

Since 1980s, the several proposals of high-speed network were made. Vladimir Putin announced plans to build a 770 km high-speed rail line that would connect Kazan and Moscow at the Economic Forum at St. Petersburg in 2013. Plans for the railroad estimate that it will be the first true high-speed line in Russia with trains operating at up to 350 km/h, reducing travel time from 13-hour to 3.5 hours. In comparison, trains on the Moscow–St. Petersburg line run at up to 250 km/h. In 2019, the date of opening changed to 2024, the initial track length was shortened from 770 km to 301 km.

Sweden 

Many of the newly built railway lines in Sweden are adapted for speeds up to 250 km/h as Botniabanan, Grödingebanan, Mälarbanan, Svealandsbanan, Västkustbanan, Vänernbanan (Gothenburg – Trollhättan).
The problem that is slowing down high-speed rail in Sweden is the present signaling system (ATC), which does not allow speeds over 200 km/h. It can be upgraded, but it will not be done since it shall be replaced by the European signaling system ERTMS level 2 on major lines in the near future, allowing high speeds up to 250 km/h. ERTMS level 2 has been installed and is being tried out on Botniabanan, and that railway allows 250 km/h, although no passenger train goes above 200 for now. The train set X55-Regina has been delivered to the rail company SJ with the max speed of 200 km/h but with the option to upgrade the EMU to 250 km/h when possible. Also the mix with freight trains slow down the practical speed.

There are four major high-speed projects proposed in Sweden with speeds between 250 and 350 km/h.
 Norrbotniabanan, Umeå – Luleå, is a future major rail project that will be built for 250 km/h with mixed passenger and freight traffic in northern Sweden, mainly to relieve the highly congested and old single track Main Line Through Upper Norrland increase freight traffic, and greatly speed up passenger traffic along the coast.
 Ostlänken: Järna – Linköping, which would relieve the congested and slow conventional main lines on the stretch Järna-Linköping, Södra stambanan.
 Götalandsbanan: Gothenburg – Jönköping – Linköping on to Stockholm via Ostlänken. It would reduce travel time Gothenburg-Stockholm from 3.05 h to 2h.
 Europabanan: Jönköping – Lund. Possibly extended to Helsingborg, Helsingör (Tunnel under Øresund) and Copenhagen.
The three first listed, but not Europabanan, have been prospected in detail by Trafikverket. In several cases the detailed alignment has been decided. There is a political interest to build all these four.
The Swedish Moderate government decided in 2012 to build Ostlänken, but with mostly max 250 km/h, after putting all projects on hold in the budget of 2011. The Social Democrat government entering in 2019 stated they want to build them, as of 2019 construction has to start on all lines.

Ukraine 
In the early 2000s, Ukraine planned to build 2593 km of upgraded high speed rail tracks between 2005 and 2015. The rolling stock was purchased in 2010. However, the maximum operating speed in Ukraine is still 160 km/h, and subsequent lack of maintenance has caused a number of derailments.

In 2011, a Moscow-Kyiv high-speed line was proposed, but Ukraine canceled the project following the 2014 conflict between the two countries. Russia, which had already purchased the rolling stock for the planned rail line to Kiyv, instead deployed the trains on the Moscow-Nizhny Novgorod line. In October 2017, it was claimed that a 330 km line between Lviv and Warsaw would begin construction in 2018, but the project has yet to break ground.

United Kingdom 

High Speed 2 (HS2) is a planned high-speed rail line mainly between London and Manchester, which will connect cities both directly and indirectly via connections to the existing British railway network. The first phase of High Speed 2 will connect London and Birmingham and is expected to be completed between 2029 and 2033. The second phase will connect Birmingham to Manchester, and a new East Midlands Hub station which will serve Nottingham and Derby.

The first phase is currently under construction. High Speed North is a proposed east–west line connecting Liverpool, Manchester and Leeds which will also connect to HS2.

Beyond HS2 Report. In May 2018, Greengauge 21 released a report entitled ‘Beyond HS2’ which looked at how the rail network could develop by 2050. It proposed several projects:
 New High Speed Line from Colchester and Cambridge (via Stansted) to Stratford (possibly extending to Canary Wharf)
 A New Higher Speed Line from Perth and Dundee to the Shotts Line
 A new High Speed Line avoiding Motherwell
 A new connection between the HS2 Eastern Leg and Kingsbury allowing services to continue to Bristol, Cardiff and Plymouth via Cheltenham Spa.
 A new link between WCML and Crossrail
 A new link between Langley and Heathrow
 A new link between Richmond and Waterloo to Heathrow T2
 A new link between Heathrow and Staines
 A new Northern Powerhouse Rail
 A new line between Darlington and Newcastle

Oceania

Australia 

There have been several proposals to develop a HSR line between Sydney and Canberra (via SYD airport and CBR airport) to link the two cities and to provide an effective second airport for Sydney. The line is also proposed to eventually continue on to Melbourne (also possibly via MEL airport). It is worth noting that the SYD-MEL air traffic corridor is one of the busiest in the world, HSR would allow for journey times city center to city center quicker than flights plus associated procedures and travel. In September 2010, Infrastructure Partnership Australia (IPA) and AECOM proposed an east coast very fast train corridor from the Sunshine Coast and Brisbane (Queensland) and onto Sydney (N.S.W), Canberra (A.C.T.) and through to Melbourne (Victoria). East Coast High Capacity Infrastructure Corridors

In May 2022, a leaked government document showed a draft for building a 250 km/h rail network around Sydney-Wollongong-Newcastle over the coming decades: Parramatta and Newcastle would have travel times slashed from 2.5 hours down to 1 hour, and Parramatta-Gosford trips would take 25 minutes. Parramatta to Canberra would take 90 minutes.

New Zealand 

As part of ongoing studies to increase the speed of a rail service from Auckland to Hamilton, potential for a new standard gauge line was identified at a cost of NZ$14.425 billion; with trains travelling at 250 km/h and taking 69 minutes to travel between the two cities.

References 

Proposed public transport